David Bruce Lellinger (born 1937, Chicago) is an American botanist, specializing in ferns. He began work at the Smithsonian Institution as a student assistant in 1960 and 1961.  He was hired as full-time staff in 1963. He was later curator of pteridology there before retiring on 3 March 2002.

Works by D. B. Lellinger
Lellinger, David B. The Ferns and Fern-Allies of Costa Rica, Panama, and the Choco (Part I: Psilotaceae through Dicksoniaceae). Pteridologia 2A: The American Fern Society, Inc. 1989. 364pp, softcover. . 
 Lellinger, David B. A Field Manual of the Ferns & Fern-Allies of the United States & Canada. Photographs by A. Murray Evans. Smithsonian Institution Press, Washington, DC. 1985. 389pp. Softcover . Hardcover . 
 Lellinger, David B. Flora of the Guianas, Series B: Ferns and Fern Allies, Fascicle 3: Hymenophyllaceae. Koeltz Scientific Books. 1994. 66pp, b/w ill, softcover. . 
 Lellinger, David B. Modern English Chinese Glossary for Taxonomic Pteridology. Missouri Botanical Garden, St. Louis, Missouri. 2007. 222pp, softcover. . 
Lellinger, David B. A Modern Multilingual Glossary for Taxonomic Pteridology. Pteridologia 3: The American Fern Society, Inc. 2002. 263pp, 270x190mm, hardcover. . .

References 

 DeFilipps, R. (2001). "Botany Profile: Pinnae for Your Thoughts." The Plant Press, vol. 4 no. 3. Smithsonian.

Pteridologists
21st-century American botanists
1937 births
Living people
20th-century American botanists